The Fighting Drummer is a 1953 French comedy film directed by Georges Combret. The film's sets were designed by the art director Marcel Magniez.

Cast
In alphabetical order
 Alfred Adam as Favrol
 Roland Armontel as Albert Gambier
 Charles Bouillaud as Arthur
 Rita Castel
 André Cornille
 Lou Darley
 Louis de Funès as Le maître d'armes
 Paul Demange
 Albert Duvaleix as Marescot
 Claude Evelyne
 André Gabriello as Bourdelas
 Jimmy Gaillard as Jimmy
 Jacques Hélian as Lui-même
 Sophie Leclair as Nicole Gambier
 Jean Marco
 Émile Mylo
 Patoum
 Alice Tissot as Hortense Gambier - la tante

References

Bibliography 
 Philippe Rège. Encyclopedia of French Film Directors, Volume 1. Scarecrow Press, 2009.

External links 
 

1953 films
1953 comedy films
French comedy films
1950s French-language films
Films directed by Georges Combret
French black-and-white films
1950s French films